Sigurbjörn Örn Hreiðarsson (born 25 November 1975) is a retired Icelandic football midfielder. He retired as Valur's leader in most games played in the Icelandic top-tier Úrvalsdeild karla. He played for Trelleborgs FF from 2000 to 2001.

Early life
Sigurbjörn was born in Reykjavík, Iceland, but moved to Dalvík when he was 8 years old. He debuted with UMFS Dalvík's senior team in 1990 at the age of 15. In the fall, he moved with his family back to Reykjavík where he started playing with Valur.

Managing career
In October 2013, Sigurbjörn was hired as the manager of Haukar.
In October 2014, Sigurbjörn was hired as an assistant manager to Ólafur Jóhannesson at Valur.
In October 2019, he signed a two-year contract to coach Grindavík.

References

1975 births
Living people
Sigurbjorn Hreidarsson
Sigurbjorn Hreidarsson
Trelleborgs FF players
Sigurbjorn Hreidarsson
Association football midfielders
Sigurbjorn Hreidarsson
Expatriate footballers in Sweden
Sigurbjorn Hreidarsson
Allsvenskan players